The Eli and Edythe Broad Art Museum (colloquially MSU Broad), is a contemporary art museum at Michigan State University in East Lansing, Michigan. It opened on November 10, 2012.

History
On June 1, 2007, Michigan State received a $28 million donation from businessman Eli Broad and his wife, Edythe, for the construction of a new art museum, to replace the old Kresge Art Museum in the school's art building. At their June 15 meeting, the MSU Board of Trustees approved the construction of the museum with initial plans to demolish the building then in the proposed location, the Paolucci Building. Michael Rush was named as the founding director in December 2010. Michael Rush died of pancreatic cancer on March 27, 2015. Marc-Olivier Wahler was named the director on March 9, 2016.

Design competition
Following the approval of the museum there were initially 10 semifinalist firms identified from a field of approximately 30 firms. From the list of semifinalists, five architectural firms were selected to submit competition proposals. The new facilities would allow MSU’s art museum to offer educational opportunities and programming such as lectures by visiting scholars, curators, artists and faculty; seminars, docent training; and special activities for families and school groups. The five finalists were:

Zaha Hadid – London
Coop Himmelb(l)au – Vienna/Los Angeles
Morphosis – Santa Monica
Kohn Pedersen Fox Associates, PC – New York
Randall Stout Architects, Inc. – Los Angeles

The selection committee announced on January 15, 2008, that Zaha Hadid had been selected.

Construction and opening
Construction on the museum began March 16, 2010, at a groundbreaking ceremony attended by Eli Broad and Zaha Hadid. Originally scheduled to open April 21, 2012, the official dedication was delayed until November due to "a combination of material supply delays and the priority placed on involving students in opening activities".

Barton Malow provided construction management services, using atypical building techniques to ensure constructibility given the unique design.

The angular facade is composed of pleated stainless steel and glass and was conceived to give the building "an ever-changing appearance that arouses curiosity yet never quite reveals its content." (Zaha Hadid Architects). The museum also includes an educational facility, a works on paper study center, administration offices, a café and a shop; as well as a pedestrian plaza and a sculpture garden.

Economic impact forecast
According to an economic study published by the Anderson Economic Group, the museum was projected to generate approximately $5.75 million per year in new spending into the regional economy. Specifically, the study predicted that visitors would spend:

$2 million in shopping, entertainment, and other retail
$1.4 million in food and drink
$1.1 million in transportation-related expenses
$1.1 million in overnight accommodations

"We fully expect to be a significant contributor to our local economic engine", said Michael Rush, founding director of the Broad Museum. The museum "will generate new opportunities for existing businesses and potentially new businesses", the report noted, adding that it "is likely to attract visitors with relatively high incomes, high levels of education, and tastes and preferences…"

References

External links

Eli and Edythe Broad Art Museum at Michigan State University
Zaha Hadid Architects

Art museums and galleries in Michigan
Contemporary art galleries in the United States
Michigan State University campus
Museums in Ingham County, Michigan
Modern art museums in the United States
University museums in Michigan
Art museums established in 2012
2012 establishments in Michigan
Michigan State University
Zaha Hadid buildings
Postmodern architecture in the United States
Neo-futurism architecture